A decadal survey is a 10-year plan outlining scientific missions and goals created by the United States National Academies.  It is a summary of input from scientists in the United States and beyond. Examples include:

 Astronomy and Astrophysics Decadal Survey
 Solar and Space Physics Decadal Survey
 Planetary Science Decadal Survey
 Earth Science Decadal Survey

See also 
 Snowmass Process

External links